Dancer's Series: Steps is an outdoor 1979 bronze sculpture series by artists Jack Mackie and Charles Greening, installed on the sidewalks of a nine-block stretch of Broadway between Pine and Roy streets in the Capitol Hill neighborhood of Seattle, Washington.

Description
The installation features nine dance patterns, some of which are "imaginary", inlaid in the sidewalk: Lindy, Mambo, Obeebo, Bus stop, Cha Cha, Foxtrot, Rumba, Tango, and Waltz. They are located between Roy and Pine streets on Broadway.

History
The installation designed and copyrighted in 1979 and dedicated in 1982. It was surveyed and deemed "well maintained" by the Smithsonian Institution's "Save Outdoor Sculpture!" program in April 1995.

See also

 1979 in art

References

1979 sculptures
1982 establishments in Washington (state)
Bronze sculptures in Washington (state)
Capitol Hill, Seattle
Outdoor sculptures in Seattle